Huntza are a Basque folk rock band from Bilbao, formed in 2014. The word Huntza is a Basque noun which means "ivy".

History 
The band was created in the streets of Bilbao, (Spain) in 2014. All the members are from different towns of Gipuzkoa.

The band first appeared on 8 March 2016 when they released the song "Harro gaude". In November 2016, they published the single "Aldapan gora", whose music video later became the most viewed song in Basque language on YouTube. The song was included in their first studio album, "Ertzetatik", released in 2016.

In 2017 they published the single "Lumak" which contains two songs.

In 2018 they published their second studio album "Xilema", containing the single "Lasai, lasai".

 Peru Altube Kazalis – drums

Discography 
Studio albums
 Ertzetatik (2016)
 Xilema (2018)
 Ezin ezer espero (2021)

References

Musical groups established in 2014
Basque music bands
2014 establishments in Spain